Garlandus Compotista, also known as Garland the Computist, was an early medieval logician, astronomer, and mathematician of the eleventh-century school of Liège.  Little is known of his life; the Dialectica published under his name by L. M. de Rijk is now commonly attributed to Gerlandus of Besançon (early 12th century). Gerlandus was most known for his Computus Gerlandi a computus that was more complex and accurate than those used in the Early Middle Ages. Using more exact mathematical and astronomical methods Garlandus changed the estimates for the Date of birth of Jesus.

Works
 Computus Gerlandi
 Dialectica, edited by L. M. De Rijk, Assen: Van Gorcum, 1959.

Notes

References
 Desmond Paul Henry, That Most Subtle Question (Quaestio Subtilissima): The Metaphysical Bearing of Medieval and Contemporary Linguistic Disciplines, Manchester: Manchester University Press, 1984
 William Kneale and Martha Kneale, The Development of Logic, Oxford: Clarendon Press, 1962, pp. 199–200
 Alfred Lohr Der Computus Gerlandi: Edition Übersetzung und Erläuterungen.(Sudhoffs Archiv 61.) Stuttgart: Franz Steiner, 2013. Paper. Pp. 493

Scholastic philosophers
People of the Prince-Bishopric of Liège
11th-century mathematicians